Music (La Musique) is a wall-size painting made by Henri Matisse in 1910. The painting was commissioned by Sergei Shchukin, who hung it with Matisse's 1910 Dance on the staircase of his Moscow mansion. Matisse made the painting without any preparatory sketches, and thus the painting bears many traces of modifications. One can virtually trace the steps Matisse took to find the intended effect. As in Dance, the aim was to show man's attainment of a state of completeness by immersion in creativity. 

The painting is now in the collection of the Hermitage Museum in Saint Petersburg, Russia.

References

1910 paintings
Paintings by Henri Matisse
Paintings in the collection of the Hermitage Museum
Musical instruments in art